The Children of Vallenato is a vallenato musical group of children. The group was created by the Vallenato Legend Festival Foundation, to promote future artist for this musical genre. The group has performed throughout the world, in many countries, including a personal presentation for former US president Bill Clinton at the White House.

References

Vallenato musical groups